Simon Lythgoe is a British television producer. Shows he has produced include American Idol, Disney's Fairy Tale Weddings, and So You Think You Can Dance. He was born in Britain and educated at Felsted School, St. Alban's College and National Film School in Beaconsfield, England. He is the son of theatre director Bonnie Lythgoe and television executive Nigel Lythgoe.

Early life

Born in North London, England, to choreographer Nigel Lythgoe and dancer Bonnie Lythgoe, he grew up in Cuffley, Hertfordshire. After attending Keble School in Winchmore Hill, North London, Simon later attended Felsted Boarding School in Essex. After completing 10 GCSEs, he attended Oaklands College in St. Albans for his A-Levels in Film Studies, Psychology and Art.  Then Simon attended the National Film School in Beaconsfield for a number of industry courses.

Career

Simon's career began in theatre, where at the early age of fifteen he was a stage-hand and performer in the local professional Panto at the Millfield Theatre in North London, England.  For three consecutive years Simon performed and was the Assistant Stage Manager  in "Jack & The Beanstalk", "Aladdin" and "Robin Hood" while simultaneously moving from theatre into television.

Upon completion of his studies worked for London Weekend Television as a senior runner and an Assistant Floor Manager. His credits include the Late Show with David Letterman, The Royal Variety Performance, Don't Forget Your Toothbrush, An Audience with ...., Gladiators, The Brian Conley Show, The Big Big Talent Show, British Comedy Awards.

In 1993 Lythgoe traveled to Australia to work on the Aussie version of Gladiators for Kevin Jacobson Productions. The monthlong engagement turned into a yearlong commitment, when Lythgoe decided to stay in Sydney working for the Seven Network. His titles ranged from 3rd Assistant Director to Floor Manager, and later a Researcher and then Associate Producer.

After a year Lythgoe returned to London, England.  He worked as the 1st Assistant Director for Sky's drama series Dream Team, produced by Hewland International.  During this time he also attended the National Film and Television School.

After completing the first series, Lythgoe emigrated permanently to Sydney, Australia. Returning to the Seven Network he worked on the Sydney 2000 Olympics, Roy & HG's Money, The Monday Dump, Saturday Disney, House of Hits, The Morning Shift, Big Arvo, People's Choice Awards, along with numerous sports events including the Bledisloe Cup, AFL, Super 12 Rugby, the Lions Tour.

During his time Down-Under, Simon returned to the theatre, where he worked as the Assistant Manager and Tech Supervisor for the Zenith Theatre in Chatswood for three years.

In 1999 Lythgoe was employed by Screentime Pty. Ltd. working in Program Development. After completing one of Australia's highest rating and groundbreaking series, Popstars Season 2 and 3, Lythgoe coerced his father, Nigel Lythgoe, to license the format for Britain's ITV network. With the overwhelming success of Popstars in the UK, Nigel formed 19 Television with Simon Fuller, and the format morphed into Pop Idol. This format was later sold to the USA, known as American Idol.

In 2002 Lythgoe left Australia and moved to Hollywood to help produce American Idol with his father, Nigel.  Lythgoe produced some of Idol's biggest success stories including Carrie Underwood and Ruben Studard. During this period Lythgoe was also the coordinating producer for So You Think You Can Dance. After six seasons of Idol and two of SYTYCD Lythgoe was poached by Steven Spielberg and Mark Burnett as a producer for the Fox Network's On The Lot. Upon completion Lythgoe was employed as an Executive for American Idol's parent company, Fremantle Media North America.  During his contract Lythgoe produced CMT's Can You Duet, NBC's Celebrity Family Feud, Fox's Osbourne Reloaded and advised on America's Got Talent, I've Got Your Number and Let's Make A Deal.

In 2010 Lythgoe left Fremantle Media N.A. and setup his own company, Legacy Productions.  The production company established development deals with a number of development Executive Producers in Hollywood. In the first quarter of 2011, Legacy Productions, with Simon as  the Showrunner, produced "CMTs Next Superstar" for Country Music Television, part of the MTV Networks.  The series was commissioned for a second season, but was later cancelled for creative and budgetary reasons. In 2012 Simon developed, directed and was the Showrunner on "A Chance to Dance" for Ovation and "Opening Act" for E! Network.  More recently Lythgoe was the Co-Executive Producer for a CBS pilot, "The Spotlight" and an untitled social experiment series for ABC Family.

In 2015 Lythgoe returned to Sydney, Australia to help produce "Aladdin" at the State Theatre for Bonnie Lythgoe Productions before returning to television in Los Angeles. He then produced a wife swap type pilot with the production company, 44Blue and the Disney cable network Freeform entitled "Take My Kids".  Simon continued to produce for the same network a special called "Disney's Fairy Tale Weddings" starring Pentatonix.  This later turned into a number of specials followed by the first series being commissioned starring Olivia Newton-John, Hunter Hayes, Martina McBride among others. In between these episodes Simon produced "Decorating Disney: Holiday Magic" and "Decorating Disney: Halloween Magic" starring Whoopi Goldberg, Jordan Fisher, Cierra Ramirez and Sophia Carson.  Both series and specials won the Bronze Tele Award for Best Entertainment Show.

In 2019 with the success of "Disney's Fairy Tale Weddings" Simon became the Executive Producer/Showrunner for Season 2 as it was transferred from the cable channel, Freeform to  Disney's new streaming service, Disney+. It was the first reality-shiny floor performance type show of its kind on the new platform.  "Disney's Fairy Tale Weddings" season 2 began streaming on Valentine's Day, 2020. 

At the turn of 2020 Legacy Productions along with Simon Lythgoe announced their partnership with the music icon, John Legend, to produce a new hybrid dating singing competition taken from a Korean format, "Love At First Song".

Filmography

Producer (selected credits)
 So You Think You Can Dance (US)
 American Idol
 Can You Duet
 CMT's Next Superstar
 A Chance To Dance
 Celebrity Family Feud
 On The Lot
 America's Got Talent
 Opening Act
 Popstars (Aus)
 Disney's Fairy Tale Weddings (TV series)

Director
 CMT's Next Superstar
 A Chance To Dance
 Opening Act
 Decorating Disney: Holiday Magic
 Decorating Disney: Halloween Magic
 Disney's Fairy Tale Weddings (TV series)

Awards and honours

2018 Tele Award Bronze - Winner
2017 Tele Award Bronze - Winner
2007 Producers Guild of America: Reality/Competition Program - Nominee
2007 Emmy: Outstanding Reality/Competition Program - Nominee
2006 Peoples Choice Award: Reality Show - Winner
2006 Emmy: Outstanding Reality/Competition Program - Nominee
2005 Emmy: Outstanding Reality/Competition Program - Nominee
2004 Emmy: Outstanding Reality/Competition Program - Nominee
2003 Grammy: Album of the Year - Nominee

References

External links

 

Living people
Year of birth missing (living people)
People from London
British television producers
Lythgoe family